Dağlı  is a village in Erdemli district of Mersin Province, Turkey. It is  situated in the forests of the Taurus Mountains. The population of Dağlı was 951 as of 2012.
The village is known for the ruins of an ancient castle which requires restoration. There is also an ancient public fountain. Main economic activity of the village is fruit farming. Citrus and tomato are the main crops, but recently, olive has been replacing the traditional crops.

See also
Dağlı Castle

References

External links
For images of the castle

Villages in Erdemli District